Yevheniy Serhiyovych Smyrnyi (born 18 August 1998) is a Ukrainian professional footballer who plays as a central midfielder for Kolos Kovalivka on loan from Dynamo Kyiv.

Career
Smyrnyi is a product of the Dynamo Kyiv sportive school. His first trainers was Vitaliy Khmelnytskyi.

He made his debut in the Ukrainian Premier League for Dynamo on 26 September 2018, playing in a match against FC Mariupol.

On 21 February 2019, Smyrnyi made his continental debut, when came on as a stoppage-time substitute in Dynamo Kyiv's 1-0 UEFA Europa League victory over Olympiacos F.C. at NSC "Olimpiyskiy".

Chornomorets Odesa
In July 2021 he moved on loan to Chornomorets Odesa.
On 25 July 2021 he made his league debut in the losing away match against Desna Chernihiv at the Chernihiv Stadium.

Career statistics

References

External links 

1998 births
Living people
Footballers from Kyiv
Ukrainian footballers
FC Dynamo Kyiv players
FC Kolos Kovalivka players
FC Chornomorets Odesa players
Ukrainian Premier League players
Association football midfielders
Ukraine youth international footballers